Arna pseudoconspersa, the tea tussock moth or Japanese browntail moth, is a moth of the family Erebidae. The species was first described by Embrik Strand in 1914. It is found in Japan, Taiwan, Korea , China and Vietnam.

Both the larvae and the adult moths have "hairs" containing toxins that cause rashes, and even dizziness and nausea in humans.

The wingspan is 13–18 mm.

The larvae feed on Camellia species.

Lymantriinae
Moths of Asia
Articles containing video clips
Moths described in 1914